NBS may refer to:

Business
 National Bank of Samoa
 National Bank of Serbia
 National Bank of Slovakia
 National Book Store, in the Philippines
 Nationwide Building Society, UK
 NBS (Natal Building Society), former bank in South Africa
 NBS Bank, Malawi
 Nelson Building Society, New Zealand
 Newcastle Building Society, UK

Science and technology
 Nature-based solutions, use of nature for addressing societal challenges
 N-Bromosuccinimide, a chemical reagent
 Newborn screening, a series of medical tests given to newborn babies
 Nijmegen breakage syndrome, a genetic medical condition

Schools
 National Broadcasting School, UK
 NUST Business School, of the National University of Sciences and Technology, Pakistan

Telecommunications
 Nagano Broadcasting Systems, Japan
 National Broadcasting Service, former name of National Broadcasting Network (Trinidad and Tobago)
 National Broadband Plan (United States)
 NBS Television (Uganda)
 Nippon Broadcasting System, Japan

Other
 Changbaishan Airport, China (IATA code)
 National Battlefield Site, a protected area in the United States
 National Building Specification, a system of construction specification used in the UK
 National Bureau of Statistics (disambiguation)
 National Bureau of Standards, former name of National Institute of Standards and Technology, US
 National Library of Serbia
 Navigation and Bombing System, formerly used by the Royal Air Force, UK
 NBS 24/7, a television series on Speed Channel